The 1996 Webster's World Matchplay was the third time the World Matchplay darts tournament had been held in the Empress Ballroom at the Winter Gardens, Blackpool between 28 July–3 August 1996.

Phil Taylor was the defending champion, but got knocked out by eventual champion Peter Evison by a convincing scoreline of 8–1 in the second round.

Prize money
The prize fund was £48,000.

Seeds
 Phil Taylor
 Dennis Priestley
 Alan Warriner
 Jamie Harvey
 John Lowe
 Bob Anderson
 Rod Harrington
 Keith Deller

Results

Preliminary round
(best of 9 legs, but need a 2 leg difference.)

Last 32

Third place playoff (best of 21 legs)
 (4) Jamie Harvey 10–11 (6) Bob Anderson

References

World Matchplay (darts)
World Matchplay Darts